Christian Gordon Cameron (born August 16, 1962) also writes under the pen names Miles Cameron and Gordon Kent (used for those novels written with his father, author Kenneth Cameron). Christian, a Canadian novelist, was educated and trained as both an historian and a former career officer in the US Navy.
His best-known work is the  historical fiction series Tyrant, which by 2009 had sold over 100,000 copies.

Biography
Cameron was born in the US, in Pittsburgh, Pennsylvania, in 1962 and grew up in Rochester, NY, and Iowa City, Iowa, as well as Rockport, Massachusetts. He attended high school at McQuaid Jesuit High School in Rochester, NY, and got an honors BA in Medieval History at the University of Rochester. After University, Cameron joined the United States Navy as an ensign, serving in VS-31 as an air intelligence officer and gaining his air observer wings before going to spend the rest of his military career as a human intelligence officer, first with NCIS and later with the DHS in Washington, DC. Cameron left the US military in 2000 as a lieutenant commander.

Christian and Kenneth Cameron proposed their first novel while Christian was still in the navy. It was published in 1998 as Night Trap in the UK and Rules of Engagement in the United States. In 2002, Cameron wrote his first solo novel, Washington and Caesar, published by HarperCollins in the UK and Random House in the US. Also in 2002, Cameron moved to Canada and married his wife, Sarah. They have one child, Beatrice.

Fictional works

Alan Craik series, written with Kenneth Cameron
The Alan Craik series of espionage thrillers was conceived by the Camerons on a camping trip in the Adirondacks in 1994-5 and the events of the first book are very loosely based on the activities of John Anthony Walker and his son, father and son spies working for the Soviet Union against the United States Navy. The Camerons envisioned the books as a modern-day Hornblower series, depicting the life of a modern naval officer from his earliest career until his retirement. Over the course of eight novels, Alan Craik changes from a patriotic, enthusiastic and driven young man to a cynical and ambitious middle-aged man who resigns as a Captain to protest the use of intelligence to justify bad political decisions.

Tyrant series
The Tyrant series was born in the classrooms of the Classics Department of the University of Toronto, where Cameron decided to write a series of historical novels in 2003.  From 2003 to the present, Cameron has written six Tyrant novels: Tyrant (2008), Storm of Arrows (2009), Funeral Games (2010), King of the Bosporus (2011), Destroyer of Cities (2013) and Force of Kings (2014).  The Tyrant series is set in the time of Alexander the Great and concerns the history of the Euxine area and the inter-relations between the Greeks and Scythians.  Cameron also produced a single volume fictional biography of Alexander entitled God of War which ties into the Tyrant series. God of War was published in 2012.

Long War series
The Long War series is Cameron's second historical series, also published by Orion in the UK. Cameron's series covers the Persian Wars from the first-person point of view of a historical figure, Arimnestos of Plataea. The first book, Killer of Men (published in 2010), is named after Achilles, the man-killer of the Iliad, and covers in first person the early life of Arimnestos and his participation in the Ionian Revolt. The next installment of the series is Marathon (published 2011), which culminates in the titular battle. Poseidon's Spear (2013) covers the five years after Marathon and is a more personal tale of adventure, exploration and revenge across the western Mediterranean and Atlantic Europe. The Great King (2014) has Arimnestos partake in Sparta's diplomatic mission to Persia and ends with the Battle of Artemisium. Salamis (2015) covers the titular battle and The Rage of Ares (2016) ends the series with the battles of Plataea and Mycale. In addition to the battles, the series also features aspects of life in ancient Greece, such as smithery, farming and sailing, and historical figures such as Heraclitus, Aristides, Gorgo and Xerxes.

Chivalry series

The Chivalry series is Cameron's third historical series, also published by Orion (May 2013).  Based loosely around the exploits of Sir William Gold, one of Sir John Hawkwood's lieutenant's in Italy, this series begins with Gold's life as a goldsmith's apprentice in London just after the great plague of 1347 and will continue through the Battle of Poitiers and the Savoyard Crusade, as well as the Peasants' Revolt of 1381, right through to the Battle of Agincourt in 1415, covering the history of the period—military, chivalric, and literary—in England, France, Italy, and Greece and roughly in parallel with the career of Chaucer's knight. Geoffrey Chaucer is a major character, along with John Hawkwood and Jean Le Maingre.

Traitor Son Cycle
Originally planned as a trilogy, and extended to a five book fantasy series with an alternative medieval setting. The major story arc takes the Red Knight from the relative obscurity of command of a little-known mercenary company to fame, international renown, worldly power, and confrontation with the real powers of his world and perhaps with his own belief system.

Masters and Mages
A magical fantasy alternate medieval setting fictional universe, written after the conclusion of the Traitor Son pentalogy, planned as a trilogy.

Reenactment

Cameron is a passionate reenactor, and uses the experiences of reenacting, including knowledge of the material culture and the skill sets required to recreate any portion of life in the past as essential tools in writing his novels.  Cameron helps organize and direct military and non-military reenactments in the United States, Canada, and Europe.

In 2011, Cameron, with the help of Greek reenactor Giannis Kadaglou, put on the 2500th anniversary of the Battle of Marathon in Marathon, Greece with over 100 reenactors from all over the world and thousands of Greek spectators. In addition to recreating the life of an early 5th-century Plataean Hoplite, Cameron also runs a group dedicated to the role of rangers and Native Americans in the American Revolution, and participates in tournaments as a knight of the late 14th century. One such tournament is the Deed of Alms, an annual HEMA (Historical European Martial Arts) charity tournament hosted in Toronto to combat homelessness.

Bibliography

As Gordon Kent

Alan Craik series

 Night Trap (1998). Published as Rules of Engagement in the USA.
 Peacemaker (2002)
 Top Hook (2002)
 Hostile Contact (2003)
 Force Protection (2004)
 Damage Control (2005)
 The Spoils of War (2006)
 The Falconer's Tale (2007)

As Christian Cameron

Tyrant Series

 Tyrant (2008)
 Storm of Arrows (2009)
 Funeral Games (2010)
 King of the Bosporus (2011)
 Destroyer of Cities (2013)
 Force of Kings (2014)

Long War Series 

 Killer of Men (2010)
 Marathon (2011)
 Poseidon's Spear (2012) 
 The Great King (2014)
 Salamis (2015)
 The Rage of Ares (2016)

Chivalry series 

 The Ill-Made Knight (2013)
 The Long Sword (2014)
 The Green Count (2017)
 Sword of Justice (2018)
 Hawkwood's Sword (2021)

Tom Swan Serials (6 or 7 to a complete novel)

 Tom Swan and the Head of St George 1: Castillon (2012)
 Tom Swan and the Head of St George 2: Venice (2012)
 Tom Swan and the Head of St George 3: Constantinople (2012)
 Tom Swan and the Head of St George 4: Rome (2013)
 Tom Swan and the Head of St George 5: Rhodes (2013)
 Tom Swan and the Head of St George 6: Chios (2013)
 Tom Swan and the Siege of Belgrade 1 (2014)
 Tom Swan and the Siege of Belgrade 2 (2014)
 Tom Swan and the Siege of Belgrade 3 (2014)
 Tom Swan and the Siege of Belgrade 4 (2015)
 Tom Swan and the Siege of Belgrade 5 (2015)
 Tom Swan and the Siege of Belgrade 6 (2015)
 Tom Swan and the Siege of Belgrade 7 (2015)
 Tom Swan and Last Spartans 1 (2016)
 Tom Swan and Last Spartans 2 (2016)
 Tom Swan and Last Spartans 3 (2017)
 Tom Swan and Last Spartans 4 (2017)
 Tom Swan and Last Spartans 5 (2017)

Commander series 

 The New Achilles (2019)
 The Last Greek (2020)

Other novels 

 Washington and Caesar (2003)
 God of War (2012)

As Miles Cameron

Traitor Son Cycle

 The Red Knight (2012)
 The Fell Sword (2014)
 The Dread Wyrm (2015)
 The Plague of Swords (2016) 
 The Fall of Dragons (2017)
 The Messenger's Tale I (2013) — short story prequel to The Red Knight 
 The Messenger's Tale II (2014) — short story set between The Fell Sword and The Dread Wyrm

Masters and Mages 

 Cold Iron (2018) 
 Dark Forge (2019) 
 Bright Steel (2019)

Other Novels 
 Artifact Space (2021)

References

External links
 Official forum website: http://www.hippeis.com/
 Official author website: https://christiancameronauthor.com/
 Author's American Revolution period reenacting group
 NFP Historical organization

1962 births
Living people
Canadian fantasy writers
Canadian male novelists
20th-century Canadian novelists
21st-century Canadian novelists
20th-century Canadian male writers
21st-century Canadian male writers
Writers of historical fiction set in antiquity
Writers of historical fiction set in the Middle Ages